Kathryn Isobel Hay (born 24 November 1975 in Launceston) is an Australian Labor politician and former member of the Tasmanian House of Assembly in the electorate of Bass. She was first elected in the 2002 election.

Hay was the first woman of Aboriginal descent to be elected in Tasmania (in her maiden speech she points out that her Aboriginal ancestors are Western Australian, not Tasmanian). She was chosen as Miss Tasmania (1999) and Miss Australia (1999).

Hay did not re-contest her seat at the 2006 election. Her term ended when parliament was dissolved on 17 March 2006.

In February 2009, Hay announced she would stand for the Legislative Council division of Windermere, but was defeated by the incumbent, Ivan Dean, at the May 2009 election.

In 2023 Kathryn Isobel Hay was charged with emotional abuse or intimidation of her husband of more than 10 years. Tasmanian Police allege, the offending was committed by Kathryn, against her husband and occurred between 22 October 2011 and 13 February 2022.

References

External links
Kathryn Hay's maiden speech to parliament

1975 births
Living people
Indigenous Australian politicians
Members of the Tasmanian House of Assembly
Australian beauty pageant winners
Australian Labor Party members of the Parliament of Tasmania
Women members of the Tasmanian House of Assembly